Krtina may refer to:
 Krtina, Domžale, a village in Upper Carniola, Slovenia
 Krtina, Trebnje, a settlement in eastern Slovenia